George Woodworth Cobb (September 25, 1865 – August 19, 1926) was a professional baseball player who played pitcher in the Major Leagues in . Cobb played for the Baltimore Orioles.

External links

 

1865 births
1926 deaths
Major League Baseball pitchers
Baltimore Orioles (NL) players
19th-century baseball players
Oakland Colonels players
San Francisco Friscos players
San Francisco Metropolitans players
Los Angeles Angels (minor league) players
Detroit Creams players
Baseball players from Iowa
People from Independence, Iowa